Dicky Kurniawan Arifin (born 6 June 2002) is an Indonesian professional footballer who plays as an attacking midfielder for Liga 2 club Gresik United.

Club career

Persebaya Surabaya
He was signed for Persebaya Surabaya and played in Liga 1 in 2021 season. Dicky made his first-team debut on 29 January 2022 in a match against PSS Sleman as a substitute for Arsenio Valpoort in the 70th minute at the Kapten I Wayan Dipta Stadium, Gianyar.

Career statistics

Club

Notes

References

External links
 Dicky Kurniawan at Soccerway
 Dicky Kurniawan at Liga Indonesia

2002 births
Living people
Indonesian footballers
People from Surabaya
Liga 1 (Indonesia) players
Liga 2 (Indonesia) players
Persebaya Surabaya players
Gresik United players
Association football midfielders
Sportspeople from Surabaya
Sportspeople from East Java